Vyacheslav Aleksandrovich Grab (born 21 September 1993) is a Russian footballer who plays as a goalkeeper for FC Okzhetpes.

Club career
He made his debut in the Russian Second Division for FC Akademiya Tolyatti on 30 June 2011 in a game against FC Nosta Novotroitsk.

He made his Russian Football National League debut for FC Tyumen on 2 September 2017 in a game against FC Khimki.

References

External links
 
 

1993 births
Living people
Russian footballers
Russian expatriate footballers
People from Tobolsk
Association football goalkeepers
Sportspeople from Tyumen Oblast
FC Tyumen players
FC Veles Moscow players
Russian First League players
Russian Second League players
FC Chayka Peschanokopskoye players
FC Torpedo Vladimir players
FC Okzhetpes players
Russian expatriate sportspeople in Kazakhstan
Expatriate footballers in Kazakhstan